Guang'anmennei Subdistrict is a subdistrict within the southern half of Xicheng District, Beijing, China. As of 2020, it has a total population of 60,318.

The subdistrict got its name due to the fact that it is located within Guang'anmen and the former Beijing city wall.

History

Administrative Division 
As of 2021, there are 18 communities within the subdistrict:

Landmark 

 Changchun Temple

External links 
 Official website (Archived)

References 

Xicheng District
Subdistricts of Beijing